The 2022 Women's Pan American Cup was the sixth edition of the Women's Pan American Cup, the quadrennial international women's field hockey championship of the Americas organized by the Pan American Hockey Federation.

It was planned to be held from 7 until 22 August 2021 in Tacarigua, Trinidad and Tobago. However, following the postponement of the 2020 Summer Olympics to July and August 2021 because of the COVID-19 pandemic the tournament was rescheduled and on 4 September 2020 the hosts Trinidad and Tobago withdrew from hosting the tournament.

Argentina were the defending champions, winning the 2017 edition. They defended their title after a final win over Chile.

The top three teams qualified for the 2022 FIH Hockey World Cup.

In November 2020, Pan American Hockey Federation announced that the cup would be held from 19 to 29 January 2022 in Santiago, Chile.

Qualification
The top six teams from the previous Pan American Cup, the host if not already qualified and the winner of the 2021 Pan American Challenge qualified for the tournament.

Mexico withdrew before the tournament.

Preliminary round

Pool A

Pool B

Classification round

Bracket

Cross-overs

Fifth and sixth place

Semi-finals

Third and fourth place

Final

Final standings

Awards

Goalscorers

See also
2022 Men's Pan American Cup

Notes

References

Women's Pan American Cup
Pan American Cup
Pan American Cup
International women's field hockey competitions hosted by Chile
Pan American Cup
Sports competitions in Santiago
2020s in Santiago, Chile
2022 in Chilean women's sport
Pan American Cup